Elec Ní hUicinn, was an Irish noblewoman, murdered 1471. 

The Annals of Connacht, sub anno 1471, 

 An attack was made by Mac Gosdelb after his own kinsmen and they killed Elec daughter of Fergal Oc O hUiginn, wife of Conchobar son of Ruaidri Oc O hUiginn, in her own house at Machaire na nAilech, most unhappily.

She would appear to have been related to Brian Ó hUiginn, who died in 1476, as both of their fathers were called Fergal or Farrell. Her brother, Niall son of Fergal Oc O hUicinn, died in 1461. Another brother, Sean mac Fergail Óicc Ó hÚigínn, died as Chief Ollamh of Ireland in poetry in 1490.

External links
 http://www.ucc.ie/celt/published/T100011/index.html

15th-century Irish women
Irish murder victims
Medieval Gaels from Ireland
People from County Mayo
People from County Roscommon
1471 deaths
15th-century Irish people
Year of birth unknown